William Lowther (17 June 1668 – 28 July 1694) was an English Member of Parliament, the posthumous son of John Lowther and his second wife, Mary Withins.

References
Lowther pedigree 2

English MPs 1690–1695
1668 births
1694 deaths
William